In Another World with My Smartphone is an anime series adapted from the light novel of the same title written by Patora Fuyuhara and illustrated by Eiji Usatsuka. The series is directed by Takeyuki Yanase at Production Reed and written by Natsuko Takahashi. Exit Tunes composed the music. It aired from July 11 to September 26, 2017, on AT-X and other channels. AŌP performed the opening theme song "Another World" while Maaya Uchida, Yui Fukuo, Chinatsu Akasaki, Marika Kouno, Nanami Yamashita, and Sumire Uesaka performed different versions of the ending theme song . Crunchyroll streamed and licensed the anime, while Funimation produced an English dub and released it on home video as part of the two companies' partnership. Funimation released the series for home video in the British Isles, and in Australia and New Zealand, through their distributors at Sony Pictures UK and Universal Sony, respectively.


Episode list

Notes

References

In Another World with My Smartphone